The Saturn Award for Best Network Television Series was presented annually by the Academy of Science Fiction, Fantasy and Horror Films, honoring the best network television series. It was introduced in 1988 and discontinued in 2015 when the Saturn Award went through major changes in their television categories.

Lost holds the record of the most wins in this category with five; additionally, Buffy the Vampire Slayer and The X-Files both won the award three times. The X-Files is also the most nominated series in the category, with eight nominations.

(NOTE: Year refers to year of eligibility, the actual ceremonies are held the following year)

The winners are listed in bold.

Winners and nominees

1980s

1990s

2000s

2010s

Most nominations
 8 nominations - The X-Files (2 consecutive; 6 consecutive)
 7 nominations:
 Buffy the Vampire Slayer (consecutive)
 Lost (consecutive)
 The Simpsons (consecutive)
 Smallville (6 consecutive)
 6 nominations:
 Angel (consecutive)
 Star Trek: The Next Generation (consecutive)
 Supernatural (2 consecutive; 3 consecutive)
 Fringe (consecutive)
 4 nominations:
 Heroes (consecutive)
 Star Trek: Enterprise (consecutive)
 3 nominations:
 Alias (consecutive)
 The Following (consecutive)
 Star Trek: Voyager (2 consecutive)
 Tales from the Crypt (2 consecutive)
 2 nominations:
 The Blacklist (consecutive)
 CSI: Crime Scene Investigation (consecutive)
 Dark Angel (consecutive)
 Grimm
 Hannibal (consecutive)
 Once Upon a Time (consecutive)
 Quantum Leap (consecutive)
 Revolution (consecutive)
 Roswell (consecutive)
 Seven Days (consecutive)
 Sleepy Hollow (consecutive)
 Sliders (consecutive)
 Star Trek: Deep Space Nine
 Terminator: The Sarah Connor Chronicles (consecutive)
 The Vampire Diaries (consecutive)
 Veronica Mars (consecutive)

Most wins
 5 wins - Lost (2 consecutive; 3 consecutive)
 3 wins:
 Buffy the Vampire Slayer (2 consecutive)
 The X-Files
 2 wins:
 Fringe (consecutive)
 Hannibal (consecutive)
 Revolution (consecutive)
 Star Trek: The Next Generation (consecutive)

See also
 Saturn Award for Best Action-Thriller Television Series
 Saturn Award for Best Animated Series or Film on Television
 Saturn Award for Best Fantasy Television Series
 Saturn Award for Best Horror Television Series
 Saturn Award for Best Science Fiction Television Series
 Saturn Award for Best Syndicated/Cable Television Series
 Saturn Award for Best Youth-Oriented Television Series

External links
 Official Site
 Internet Movie Database: 16th, 17th, 18th, 19th, 20th, 21st, 22nd, 23rd, 24th, 25th, 26th, 27th, 28th, 29th, 30th, 31st, 32nd, 33rd, 34th, 35th, 36th, 37th, 38th, 39th, 40th, 41st

Network Television Series

fr:Saturn Award de la meilleure série#Meilleure série diffusée sur les réseaux nationaux